The Shannon-class lifeboat (previously FCB2 – Fast Carriage Boat 2) is the latest class of lifeboat currently being deployed to the RNLI fleet to serve the shores of the British Isles. The Shannon class is due to replace the Mersey class carriage-launched lifeboat, the remaining Tyne-class lifeboats, and the Trent-class lifeboats in due course.

History

The experimental boat, named Effseabee Too underwent sea trials during 2005–2008. It is based on a Camarc Pilot vessel design, and was designed by RNLI engineers, with a fibre-reinforced composite hull, powered by twin water jets. In 2008, FCB2 development was delayed due to hull shape issues, as trials showed crews would be subjected to unacceptable shocks and excessive horizontal shaking in high seas. The RNLI indicated that the project would be extended by at least three more years to research a new hull shape.

In April 2009 it was announced a new hull had been chosen. The Shannon class prototype boat was completed late 2011 when active service was expected to start in mid-2013.

In April 2011 it was announced the class would be named after the River Shannon, the longest river in Ireland. This is the first time that the name of an Irish river has been used for a class of RNLI lifeboat.

After boatyard acceptance in March 2012 the first of the fleet went through sea acceptance trials in 2012. 

Early hulls were moulded by SAR Composites and up to ON1318 were fitted out by Berthon Boat Co. of Lymington.

From ON1319 fitting-out progressively switched to the RNLI All-Weather Lifeboat Centre (ALC) at Poole, to which hull moulding also transferred from ON1330.

Service
The first Shannon-class to be delivered for service was demonstrated at Dungeness, Kent on 21 February 2014. The boat, to begin active service the following month, has been named The Morrell in honour of Barbara Morrell, a keen fundraiser for the RNLI who bequeathed the service £6 million which she asked to be used for a lifeboat for Kent.

The Shannon class uses similar Systems and Information Management System (SIMS) technology to that of the Tamar class lifeboat so that crew members can operate all of the boat's systems collaboratively without leaving their seats. Crew seats are also similar to the Tamar, sprung to reduce the shocks in heavy seas.  

Most Shannons are launched by a newly designed Shannon Launch and Recovery System (SLARS) by which a tractor propels the lifeboat on its cradle into the water. The cradle is then tilted and acts as a mobile slipway as the boat is launched by release of a single bow strop from the wheelhouse, rather than the old carriage launched method of four chains being released by crew members on deck. Recovery is bow first onto the cradle, which then rotates through 180 degrees, enabling the boat to be launched again within ten minutes. Some Shannons are due to be kept afloat at moorings or a pontoon berth and the boats are also capable of being slipway launched, although only  currently has a slipway launched Shannon. The boat at Workington uses the same davit crane system as the previous Tyne class boat.

Fleet

Note 1: Relief boats use the launch method of the station they are covering. Boats are capable of any of the launch methods but may require minor modification.

References

External links 

 RNLI Fleet

Royal National Lifeboat Institution lifeboats